Annie Maude Starke Albu (born April 26, 1988) is an American actress who has appeared on film and Broadway.

Early years
The daughter of actress Glenn Close and businessman John Starke, she was raised in Bedford, New York. Starke attended Hamilton College in Clinton, New York, studying the history of art.

Career
Starke appeared in the films Albert Nobbs, We Don’t Belong Here, and in The Wife as a younger version of Joan Castleman, the character played by her mother Glenn Close. Starke also played a younger version of Close in the Owen Wilson and Ed Helms comedy Father Figures.

Personal life
Starke’s godfather is Robert F. Kennedy Jr. Starke married money manager Marc Albu in Bedford, New York at her mother Glenn Close's estate in June 2018. Starke is a dog lover and – as of March 2018 – has a Labrador called Big Al.

Starke is an equestrian; in February 2004, at age 15, she won the Children's Modified Jumper Championship competition at the 32nd Winter Equestrian Festival in Florida.

Filmography

Film

Television

References

External links
 

1988 births
Living people
21st-century American actresses
Actresses from New York (state)
American female equestrians
American film actresses
American stage actresses
Hamilton College (New York) alumni
People from Bedford, New York